ST Telemedia (STT) is a Singapore-headquartered strategic investor specialising in Communications and Media, Data Centres and Infrastructure Technology businesses globally. It is represented in 15 countries, three continents across Asia Pacific, the US and Europe. It is a portfolio company of Temasek Holdings. In 2016, the company refreshed its corporate identity, adopting a new logo and streamlined business name ST Telemedia.

Business activities
STT's investment portfolio is centred on three business segments across the digital value chain – Communication & Media, Data Centres, and Infrastructure Technology.

2020

 In March 2020, STT announced the completion of its majority investment in CloudCover, a cloud-native service provider with presence in India and Southeast Asia.

2019

 In January 2019, STT announced that it completed the acquisition of a majority stake in Cloud Comrade, a Singapore-based cloud computing company with presence also in Malaysia and Indonesia.
 ST Telemedia Cloud, a public cloud solutions provider across APAC was established. 
 Quantum Security, a portfolio company of STT announced its official entry into the AI and Cloud IT market. 
 In October 2019, STT announced that it was taking a majority stake in Seattle-based cloud service provider 2nd Watch.

2018

 In January 2018, STT led in a new round of funding for Bespin Global, a cloud management company which helps enterprise customers in South Korea and China with cloud adoption.

2017

 In November 2017, STT led in a new round of funding for Instart Logic, which created a cloud-based digital experience platform that enables brands to increase their online performance.
 In April 2017, STT announced its investment in Dallas-based Armor, The First Totally Secure Cloud Company™, and became a joint lead shareholder with The Stephens Group. Armor’s proprietary platform integrates threat intelligence, automated security orchestration and machine learning managed by a world-class security operations centre.

2016

 In August 2016, STT unveiled a refreshed corporate identity to reflect its new strategic direction.
 In June 2016, STT announced its lead investment in Moogsoft's Series C financing, giving the real-time IT Operation Analytics provider a boost to expand its global operations in Europe, Asia and Americas.
 In May 2016, STT announced its strategic partnership with Tata Communications to expand data centre business in India and Singapore. The partnership involved a 74% majority stake acquisition of Tata Communications’ data centre business in India and Singapore by STT’s wholly owned subsidiary, ST Telemedia Global Data Centres (STT GDC). Tata Communications remains as a significant shareholder, holding the remaining 26% stake in the business. The acquisition of the data centres in India was completed in October 2016, while the acquisition of the data centres in Singapore completed in February 2017.

2015

 In August 2015, STT made its first investment in emerging technology verticals, leading a US$40 million financing round in Datameer, a big data analytics and visualization company based in San Francisco, California. Datameer is a big data analytics platform that helps companies create and extract value from enterprise data lakes.
 In July 2015, STT announced a joint venture partnership where its portfolio companies STT GDC and StarHub agreed to build and develop MediaHub, a highly specialised telecommunications, media and data centre facility.
 In June 2015, STT, through STT GDC, invested in VIRTUS Data Centres in the UK.
 In March 2015, STT announced plans to build its flagship data centre, known as STT Defu, in Singapore.

2014

 In August 2014, STT re-entered the data centre market with its investment in GDS Services (GDS), a leading provider of advanced and high-availability data centre services in China.

2011

 In May 2011, STT invested in Sky Cable, the Philippines' largest cable company and leading broadband service provider.

2010

 In March 2010, STT acquired a 33% stake in U Mobile, Malaysia's fourth mobile service provider. It also took a 10% stake in VNPT Global, a subsidiary of VNPT Group, Vietnam's foremost full service telecommunications service operator.

Corporate social responsibility
STT's CSR efforts are focused on three core areas: nurturing future generations, enriching communities and sustaining industries.

Nurturing Future Generations
The company supports and initiates programmes that enable both current and future generations to achieve their full potential. In 2017, STT launched the ‘ST Telemedia Catalyst Award’ in partnership with Temasek Polytechnic.

In 2019, STT established three university scholarships for Singaporeans from disadvantaged backgrounds to mark its 25th anniversary. The bond-free, full scholarships are in partnership with Lee Kuan Yew School of Public Policy, Fitzwilliam College, Cambridge, and Somerville College, Oxford.

In 2022, ST Telemedia launched study awards with the Singapore University of Technology and Design for the Data Analytics and Business Analytics and Operations Research tracks, and with the Singapore Institute of Technology in the disciplines of Computing Science; Information Security and Software Engineering. The awards, which will be given out annually for three years, seek to recognise and encourage academic excellence among students in the disciplines related to its business focuses.

Enriching Communities
STT also works with underserved populations and sectors within the community, contributing directly to areas such as disaster relief, marine conservation, as well as health-related and hope and dignity projects.

Sustaining Industries
STT also supports multiple platforms and initiatives across Asia and the world to better understand and promote effective solutions in the complex business landscape today.

References

Investment companies of Singapore
Telecommunications companies of Singapore
Singaporean brands